The Burying in Woollen Acts 1666–80 were Acts of the Parliament of England (citation 18 & 19 Cha. 2 c. 4 (1666), 30 Cha. 2 c. 3 (1678)  and 32 Cha. 2 c. 1 (1680) ) which required the dead, except plague victims and the destitute, to be buried in pure English woollen shrouds to the exclusion of any foreign textiles.

Enforcement
It was a requirement that an affidavit be sworn in front of a justice of the peace (usually by a relative of the deceased), confirming burial in wool, with the punishment of a £5 fee for noncompliance.  Burial entries in parish registers were marked with the word "affidavit" or its equivalent to confirm that affidavit had been sworn; it would be marked "naked" for those too poor to afford the woollen shroud.  

The legislation was in force until 1814, but was generally ignored after 1770. The 1666 Act was repealed by the Statute Law Revision Act 1863.

Use in genealogy
Burial records so annotated can be a source of genealogical information, providing evidence of economic status and relationships that may be otherwise unavailable or ambiguous.

References

Acts of the Parliament of England
Burials in England
Legal aspects of death
Woolen clothing
1666 in law
1678 in law
1680 in law
1666 in England
1678 in England
1680 in England